The 1986 United States House of Representatives elections in South Carolina were held on November 4, 1986, to select six Representatives for two-year terms from the state of South Carolina.  The primary elections for the Democrats and the Republicans were held on June 10 and the runoff elections were held two weeks later on June 24.  All four incumbents who ran were re-elected and the Democrats picked up one of the two open seats vacated by the Republicans.  The composition of the state delegation after the elections was four Democrats and two Republicans.

1st congressional district
Incumbent Republican Congressman Thomas F. Hartnett of the 1st congressional district, in office since 1981, chose to not seek re-election and instead made an unsuccessful run for lieutenant governor.  The open seat was won by Republican state senator Arthur Ravenel, Jr.

Democratic primary

Republican primary

General election results

|-
| 
| colspan=5 |Republican hold
|-

2nd congressional district
Incumbent Republican Congressman Floyd Spence of the 2nd congressional district, in office since 1971, defeated Democratic challenger Fred Zeigler.

Democratic primary

General election results

|-
| 
| colspan=5 |Republican hold
|-

3rd congressional district
Incumbent Democratic Congressman Butler Derrick of the 3rd congressional district, in office since 1975, defeated Republican challenger Richard Dickson.

General election results

|-
| 
| colspan=5 |Democratic hold
|-

4th congressional district
Incumbent Republican Congressman Carroll Campbell of the 4th congressional district, in office since 1979, chose to not seek re-election and instead made a successful run for governor.  The open seat was won by Democratic state senator Liz J. Patterson.

Republican primary

General election results

|-
| 
| colspan=5 |Democratic gain from Republican
|-

5th congressional district
Incumbent Democratic Congressman John M. Spratt, Jr. of the 5th congressional district, in office since 1983, was unopposed in his bid for re-election.

General election results

|-
| 
| colspan=5 |Democratic hold
|-

6th congressional district
Incumbent Democratic Congressman Robin Tallon of the 6th congressional district, in office since 1983, defeated Republican challenger Robbie Cunningham.

Democratic primary

General election results

|-
| 
| colspan=5 |Democratic hold
|-

See also
United States House elections, 1986
United States Senate election in South Carolina, 1986
South Carolina gubernatorial election, 1986
South Carolina's congressional districts

References

United States House of Representatives
1986
South Carolina